The Rhein-Hellweg-Express (RE 11) is a Regional-Express service in the German state of North Rhine-Westphalia (NRW), running from Hamm via Dortmund, Bochum, Essen, Duisburg and Düsseldorf Airport to Düsseldorf Hbf. It is named after the Rhine and the Westphalian Hellweg. The line is part of the Rhine-Ruhr Express (RRX) network and is operated by National Express.

History 
In 1988 the first regular interval regional rapid train service was established from Dortmund via Essen, Duisburg and Düsseldorf to Cologne. This operated hourly on the Cologne–Duisburg and Dortmund–Duisburg lines, which even then were the most important railway lines for passenger traffic in North Rhine-Westphalia.

With the introduction of high-speed regional services in the early 1990s, this line was named the NRW-Express (originally numbered RSB 1; from 1995 it was redesignated as Stadt-Express line SE 1) and ran from Bielefeld via Hamm, Dortmund, Essen, Duisburg, Düsseldorf and Cologne to Aachen. With the extension of the service on the Hamm–Bielefeld and  Cologne–Aachen lines, the service soon had insufficient capacity. Therefore, in May 1998 with the NRW-wide implementation of regional express lines, the NRW-Express (now RE 1) was supplemented by the Westfalen-Express (RE 6) from Bielefeld via Hamm, Dortmund, Essen and Duisburg to Düsseldorf so that on the northern section there were two Regional-Expresses per hour.

Timetable change in 2002
After the timetable change in December 2002, services on the central Ruhr axis between Hamm and Düsseldorf increased to five Regional-Express services in each two hour period. The NRW-Express was now shortened to run on the Hamm–Aachen route, the Westfalen-Express (RE 6) was established between Düsseldorf and Minden. The new Rhein-Hellweg-Express (RE 11) was introduced at two hourly intervals, running from Düsseldorf to Hamm and continuing on the line to Paderborn.

Timetable change in 2010
When the timetable change in December 2010 there was an exchange of sections between the NRW-Express, the Rhein-Hellweg Express and Rhein-Haard-Express (RE 2):
The section of the Rhein-Hellweg-Express from Hamm via Soest and Lippstadt to Paderborn was taken over by the NRW-Express; this section continues to be operated only every two hours.
The section of the Rhein-Hellweg Express between Duisburg and Düsseldorf (now operated hourly) was taken over by the Rhein-Haard-Express. In return, the Rhein-Hellweg Express runs (now also hourly) on the section between Duisburg and Mönchengladbach. The Duisburg–Mönchengladbach line is for the first time connected directly to the eastern Ruhr region by Regional-Express services.

Overall, there were further bottlenecks due to the timetable change. In the central Ruhr area between Hamm and Duisburg, three regional express lines (RE 1, RE 6 and RE 11) were now running at approximately 20-minute intervals. The Hamm–Dortmund section was reinforced by RE 3, the Bochum–Essen section by RE 16 and the Essen–Duisburg section by RE 2.

Timetable change in 2016
In the course of the development of the Rhein-Ruhr-Express (RRX, an upgraded Regional-Express system) network, the Rhein-Hellweg-Express returned to its original route between Düsseldorf and Paderborn and was extended to Kassel-Wilhelmshöhe at the timetable change on 11 December 2016. The section between Hamm and Kassel, however is only operated generally at two-hour intervals and some trains even in the afternoon peak terminate in Paderborn. Due to some remaining IC/ICE services on the line, there are unsatisfactory gaps in the regional services of up to four hours in both directions, especially at lunch time. Departure times also differ significantly, so the timetable is difficult for customers to remember since there are no regular services.

In the evenings, the RE 11 service from Düsseldorf ends in Dortmund. At the other end, some services only run from Kassel to Hamm, so passengers are forced to change trains regularly to reach the Ruhr area or Düsseldorf.

Due to longer scheduled stays in Duisburg and Dortmund, the travel time of regional services between Paderborn and Düsseldorf has increased by up to ten minutes compared to the previous operation by RE 1. The use of the class 425 sets has significantly reduced the capacity of seating and standing places. The number of daily circuits serving the entire route has been reduced from eight to seven. The section of Eurobahn's daily Dortmund-Kassel-Sprinter service from Hamm was integrated in RE 11.

The section of the RE 11 from Duisburg via Krefeld to Mönchengladbach that is no longer served by the RE 11 was replaced by the RE 42 (Niers-Haard-Express), which was upgraded from the RB 42 and extended from Münster via Essen, Mülheim, Duisburg and Krefeld to Mönchengladbach.

Timetable change in 2021 
Due to Construction work that is conducted at Dortmund Hauptbahnhof as well as the railway line between Soest and Hamm, all Trains will be diverted via Unna and Dortmund-Hörde. As of November 2022, the Construction work is schedueled to be done by April 2023.

Route

The Rhein-Hellweg Express runs daily every hour (every two hours between Hamm and Kassel-Wilhelmshöhe) and uses five railway lines:
The Kassel–Warburg railway (built by the Frederick William Northern Railway of the Electorate of Hesse) throughout, which is also used by other regional and long-distance services,
The Hamm–Warburg railway (built by the Cologne-Minden-Thuringian Connection Railway Company until its bankruptcy and completed by the Royal Westphalian Railway Company) throughout, which is also used by other regional and long-distance services,
The Dortmund–Hamm railway (built by the Cologne-Minden Railway Company), which is also used by three other Regional-Express services and long-distance trains,
the Ruhr line from Dortmund to Duisburg (built by the Bergisch-Märkische Railway Company), using the long-distance tracks, which is also used by regional and long-distance trains,
The Cologne–Duisburg railway (built by the Cologne-Minden Railway Company) from Duisburg to Düsseldorf. The Rhein-Hellweg-Express uses the so-called local tracks or the S-Bahn tracks, as does the Rhein-Haard-Express (RE 2), the Rhein-Emscher-Express (RE 3), the Rhein-Weser-Express (RE 6), the Rhein-IJssel-Express (RE 19) and, in some sections, the S-Bahn. Only the NRW-Express (RE 1) and the Rhein-Express (RE 5) use the long-distance tracks.

Operations

RE 11 services runs hourly from Monday to Sunday. Initially, when the service operated between Hamm and Paderborn on weekdays at two hourly intervals, trains were composed of class 110 and 111 locomotives, usually hauling five Silberling carriages. But it was soon noticed that the number of passengers required higher capacity, which meant that class 112 (sometimes class 111) locomotives are now used with four double-decker carriages.

From 21 February 2011, in addition to the double-decker trains, class 425 electric multiple units were used on the Rhein-Hellweg Express, these had previously been modernised for use on this service. Double-deck trains remained operating on the line until the completion of the conversion to operation with class 425 EMUs. It has been operated with Siemens Desiro HC railcars since 2018.

Operator 
Abellio Rail NRW took over operations on the line from 9 December 2018. This subsidiary of Nederlandse Spoorwegen won the contract for the operation of the NRW-Express as Lot 1 of the Rhein-Ruhr-Express. National Express Germany replaced Abellio in 2022.

The line was formerly operated by DB Regio NRW under a special contract with the North Rhine-Westphalian public transport associations. DB Regio NRW had the contract to operate the line until the timetable change on 13 December 2015. The contract included provisions for services every two hours between Hamm and Paderborn; this section became part of the RE 1 at the timetable change in December 2010, committing operations on this line to run permanently with a sixth double-deck coach. As part of the so-called RRX interim contract, operations from December 2016 until the commissioning of RRX rolling stock were provided by DB Regio.

See also

 List of regional rail lines in North Rhine-Westphalia
 List of scheduled railway routes in Germany

Notes

External links 

 
 

Rail services in North Rhine-Westphalia
Named DB Regio services